Ronald Bernard Nicholls (born 4 December 1933 in Sharpness —- died 21 July 1994 in Cheltenham) was an English first-class cricketer who played for Gloucestershire.

In a game in 1962 against Oxford University he opening the batting with Martin Young and they put on 395 runs. The partnership remains the highest for any wicket by Gloucestershire and Nicholls made his career best score of 217. He finished the year with 2059 runs. He also kept wicket in some John Player League games.

Nicholls also played football playing in goal for Bristol Rovers, Cardiff City, Bristol City and Cheltenham Town

External links
Cricket Archive
Gloucestershire batting records
Bristol City profile

1933 births
1994 deaths
People from Stroud District
English footballers
Association football goalkeepers
Cardiff City F.C. players
Bristol Rovers F.C. players
Bristol City F.C. players
Cheltenham Town F.C. players
English Football League players
English cricketers
Gloucestershire cricketers
Sportspeople from Gloucestershire